Chad Oxendine (born June 10, 1981) is an American baseball coach and former catcher who is the current the head baseball coach of the Longwood Lancers. He played college baseball at Coastal Carolina for head coach Gary Gilmore from 2001 to 2004.

Playing career 
Oxendine was a catcher at Coastal Carolina from 2001 to 2004, where he was a co-captain his junior and senior seasons, as well as a second-team All-Big South Conference player as a senior. He signed with the Chicago White Sox after college, spending one season with the Bristol White Sox of the Appalachian League before turning to coaching.

Coaching career 
Oxendine began his coaching career as a volunteer assistant at UNC Wilmington and later Alabama. He was named a full-time assistant at Richmond in July 2007 and spent three seasons with the program before joining the Myrtle Beach Pelicans, a single-A baseball team that was a part of the Texas Rangers system at the time, as their hitting coach in 2011. He spent one season at his alma mater Coastal Carolina as a volunteer assistant, and did not coach college baseball until he was named an assistant coach at Longwood in 2015.

Oxendine returned to Coastal Carolina in 2017 to serve as the program's director of baseball operations. He was promoted to director of player development in 2020, also adding operations and data analytics duties.

Oxendine was named head coach at Longwood on June 28, 2021.

Head coaching record

References

External links 
 
 Longwood Lancers profile
 Chad Oxendine Minor League Statistics at Baseball-Reference.com

1981 births
Living people
People from Lumberton, North Carolina
Baseball players from North Carolina
Baseball coaches from North Carolina
Baseball catchers
Coastal Carolina Chanticleers baseball players
Bristol White Sox players
UNC Wilmington Seahawks baseball coaches
Alabama Crimson Tide baseball coaches
Richmond Spiders baseball coaches
Coastal Carolina Chanticleers baseball coaches
Longwood Lancers baseball coaches